Parapoynx diminutalis is a species of moth of the family Crambidae described by Pieter Cornelius Tobias Snellen in 1880. It is endemic to south-east Asia, including the Northern Territory, Queensland and New South Wales in Australia, but has since been found in the United Kingdom and the United States. It is also found in Africa, where it has been recorded from Egypt, Sudan, Ethiopia, Kenya, Uganda, Tanzania, Zambia, Zimbabwe, Malawi, South Africa, Botswana, Angola, the Republic of the Congo, Nigeria and Madagascar.

The wingspan is 11–14 mm for males and 16–23 mm for females. The forewings are white, suffused with fuscous. The hindwings are white with a fuscous Y-shaped median fascia.

The larvae feed on Hydrilla and Nymphaea species.

References

External links

Acentropinae
Moths of Japan
Moths of Africa
Moths of Madagascar
Moths of Mauritius
Moths of Réunion
Moths described in 1880